Shehryar Zaidi  is a veteran Pakistani television actor. He is known for his acting for PTV Home and other networks tv dramas.

Career
He has appeared in a variety of television dramas and musical shows. He has worked with some big names of Pakistani industry. Mostly he has had roles where he has complex relationship with his children in these dramas. He has worked the most with Ismat Zaidi. He is famous for his role of Farooq in Sehra Main Safar, in which he has acted as the brother of Lubna Aslam, uncle of Ali Kazmi, father of Zarnish Khan.

Television
Some of his major TV dramas are:

References

Male actors from Lahore
Muhajir people
Pakistani male television actors